Buzzsaw is a common alternative name for a circular saw.

Buzzsaw may also refer to:

 BuzzSaw, a former rock channel of Sirius Satellite Radio
 Buzzsaw (roller coaster), a roller coaster at the Dreamworld theme park on the Gold Coast, Australia
 Buzzsaw (Transformers), the name of several characters from the Transformers franchise
 The mascot of Howard Payne University
 The Arizona Cardinals of the NFL
 A "stalkers" from the movie The Running Man
 A discontinued file sharing and synchronization service operated by Autodesk
 "Hitler's Buzzsaw", the MG 42 general-purpose machine gun
 "Buzzsaw", a song by The Turtles from The Turtles Present the Battle of the Bands
 "Buzz Saw", a song by Xiu Xiu from their 2006 album The Air Force